Athis inca is a moth of the Castniidae family. It is found from Mexico to Costa Rica.

Subspecies
Athis inca inca (Honduras)
Athis inca briareus (Houlbert, 1917) (Mexico)
Athis inca dincadu (Miller, 1972) (Panama)
Athis inca orizabensis (Strand, 1913) (Mexico (Veracruz))

External links
Notes on some Athis inca ssp. collected in Mexico (Lepidoptera: Castniidae)

Castniidae